Donald Alfred Hansen (1924-1981) was a provincial level politician from Alberta, Canada. He served as a member of the Legislative Assembly of Alberta from 1971 to 1979 sitting with the governing Progressive Conservative party.

Political career
Hansen ran for a seat to the Alberta Legislature in the 1971 Alberta general election. He won the electoral district of Bonnyville defeating two other candidates in a closely contested race to pick up the seat for the Progressive Conservatives who went on to form government in that election.

Hansen ran for a second term in the 1975 Alberta general election. He won a much larger victory compared to his result in 1971 over three challenging candidates to return to the legislature. He retired at dissolution of the assembly in 1979.

References

External links
Legislative Assembly of Alberta Members Listing

Progressive Conservative Association of Alberta MLAs
1924 births
1981 deaths